Togni reagent II (1-trifluoromethyl-1,2-benziodoxol-3(1H)-one) is a chemical compound used in organic synthesis for direct electrophilic trifluoromethylation.

History 
Synthesis, properties, and reactivity of the compound were first described in 2006 by Antonio Togni and his coworkers at ETH Zurich. The article also contains information on Togni reagent I (1,3-dihydro-3,3-dimethyl-1-(trifluoromethyl)-1,2-benziodoxole).

Preparation 
The synthesis consists of three steps. In the first step, 2-iodobenzoic acid is oxidized by sodium periodate and cyclized to 1-hydroxy-1,2-benziodoxol-3(1H)-one. The target compound can then be obtained by acylation with acetic anhydride and subsequent substitution reaction with trifluoromethyltrimethylsilane.

Alternatively, trichloroisocyanuric acid can be used as oxidant in the place of sodium periodate for a newer one-pot synthesis method.

Properties

Physical properties 
The compound crystallized in a monoclinic crystal structure. The space group is P21/n with four molecules in the unit cell. From the crystallographic data, a density of 2.365 g·cm−3  was deduced.

Chemical properties 

Pure Togni reagent II is metastable at room temperature. Heating it above the melting point will lead to strong exothermic decomposition, in which trifluoroiodomethane (CF3I) is released. The heat of composition at a temperature of 149 °C and higher has been determined to be 502 J·g−1. From recrystallization in acetonitrile, small amounts of trifluoromethyl-2-iodobenzoate and 2-iodobenzyl fluoride were observed as decomposition products. Togni reagent II reacts violently with strong bases and acids, as well as reductants. In tetrahydrofuran, the compound polymerizes.

Uses 
Togni reagent II is used for trifluoromethylation of organic compounds. For phenolates, the substitution takes place preferably in the ortho position. It is possible to obtain a second substitution by using an excess of Togni reagent II.

Reactions with alcohols yield the corresponding trifluoromethyl ethers.

Trifluoromethylation of alkenes is possible under copper catalysis.

References 

Trifluoromethyl compounds
Iodanes
Lactones
Benzene derivatives
Reagents for organic chemistry